Rang Shawkat Barawy (born 7 April 1986) is a Danish former footballer. During the 2007–08 season, Shawkat made three appearances for Lyngby Boldklub in the Danish Superliga. His debut at the highest level came on 20 August 2007 in a home match against Esbjerg fB, which Lyngby lost 1–6. Afterwards, he failed to establish himself on the team as he suffered a series of debilitating knee injuries, which kept him sidelined for prolonged periods of time.

He is a former Danish youth international.

References

External links
Lyngby BK profile
National team profile
Career statistics at Danmarks Radio

1986 births
Living people
Danish men's footballers
Lyngby Boldklub players
Boldklubben af 1893 players
Taastrup FC players
Fremad Amager players
Danish Superliga players
Danish people of Kurdish descent
Kurdish sportspeople
Association football defenders
Footballers from Copenhagen